Medway was a county constituency represented in the House of Commons of the Parliament of the United Kingdom between 1983 and 2010. A previous constituency of the same name existed from 1885 to 1918.

Boundaries

1885–1918
The Mid or Medway Division of Kent was created by the Redistribution of Seats Act 1885. It comprised a rural area
consisting of the petty sessional divisions of Bearstead, Rochester and part of Malling PSD, but did not include the Medway Towns which were comprised in the parliamentary boroughs of Chatham and Rochester. It also surrounded, but did not include the town of Maidstone. It comprised these parishes:

 Addington
 Allhallows
 Allington
 Aylesford
 Bearsted
 Bicknor
 Birling
 Boughton Malherbe
 Boughton Monchelsea
 Boxley
 Bredhurst
 Broomfield
 Burham
 Chalk
 Chatham (rural)
 Chart Sutton
 Cliffe
 Cobham
 Cooling
 Cuxton
 Denton
 Ditton
 East Barming
 East Farleigh
 East Malling
 East Sutton
 Frindsbury (rural)
 Frinsted
 Gillingham (rural)
 Grange
 Halling
 Harrietsham
 Headcorn
 High Halstow
 Higham
 Hollingbourne
 Hoo Peninsula
 Hucking
 Ifield
 Ightham
 Isle of Grain
 Langley
 Leeds
 Lenham
 Leybourne
 Lidsing
 Linton
 Loose
 Luddesdown
 Meopham
 Mereworth
 Northfleet (rural)
 Nursted
 Offham
 Otterden
 Ryarsh
 St Mary Hoo
 Shorne
 Snodland
 Stansted
 Stockbury
 Stoke
 Strood (rural)
 Sutton Valence
 Teston
 Thurnham
 Trottiscliffe
 Ulcombe
 Wateringbury
 West Barming
 West Farleigh
 West Malling
 West Peckham
 Wichling
 Wormshill
 Wouldham
 Wrotham

The Rochester seat is an old one, going back to the 16th century, but it saw many changes in the 20th century. In 1918 it was split between Chatham and Gillingham. The Chatham seat became Rochester and Chatham in 1950, and then Medway in 1983.

1983–2010
The constituency was revived in 1983 by Parliament's acceptance of a Boundary Commission national review, and was defined as comprising thirteen wards of the then City of Rochester upon Medway: All Saints, Cuxton and Halling, Earl, Frindsbury, Frindsbury Extra, Hoo St. Werburgh, Rede Court, St. Margarets and Borstal, Temple Farm, Thames Side, Town, Troy Town and Warren Wood.

Boundaries were not changed at the next redistribution that followed the Fourth Review for the 1997 election.

Conveniently but somewhat confusingly 1998 Rochester upon Medway merged with the neighbouring Borough of Gillingham to form the larger unitary Borough of Medway. The Medway constituency covered only part of the unitary authority: some towns in the borough of Medway, such as Gillingham (Gillingham) or Chatham see (Chatham and Aylesford) had and retain their own constituency. Because of this, the name of the seat caused much confusion leading to its renaming in 2010.

Boundary review
Following the boundary review of parliamentary representation in Kent between 2000 and 2008, the Boundary Commission for England renamed the Medway seat to Rochester and Strood. This is because the Commission agreed that the term "Medway" is now primarily used for the larger unitary authority.

The constituency consists of ten wards of the Borough of Medway: Cuxton and Halling, Peninsula, River, Rochester East, Rochester South and Horsted, Rochester West, Strood North, Strood Rural and Strood South.

Members of Parliament

MPs 1885–1918

MPs 1983–2010

Election results 1885-1918

Elections in the 1880s

Elections in the 1890s

Elections in the 1900s

Elections in the 1910s

General Election 1914–15:

Another General Election was required to take place before the end of 1915. The political parties had been making preparations for an election to take place and by July 1914, the following candidates had been selected;
 Unionist: Charles Warde
 Liberal:

Elections 1983-2005

Elections in the 2000s

Elections in the 1990s

Elections in the 1980s

See also
 List of parliamentary constituencies in Kent

Notes and references

Politics of Medway
Constituencies of the Parliament of the United Kingdom established in 1885
Constituencies of the Parliament of the United Kingdom disestablished in 1918
Constituencies of the Parliament of the United Kingdom established in 1983
Constituencies of the Parliament of the United Kingdom disestablished in 2010
Parliamentary constituencies in Kent (historic)